Aleksandr Mykolayovych Yarmola (born 6 October 1978) is a Ukrainian former professional tennis player.

Yarmola, a doubles bronze medalist at the 1997 Summer Universiade, competed in satellite, ITF Futures and ATP Challenger tournaments at professional level. He won the doubles title at the Donetsk Challenger in 2006, partnering Oleksandr Nedovyesov. His career best rankings of 622 for singles and 419 for doubles were both reached in 2007.

Challenger/Futures titles

Doubles: (2)

References

External links
 
 

1978 births
Living people
Ukrainian male tennis players
Universiade medalists in tennis
Universiade bronze medalists for Ukraine
Medalists at the 1997 Summer Universiade